"On Top" is the second single by American rapper Twista of his seventh album Category F5. The song features R&B singer Akon and was produced by GoodWill & MGI, "On Top" was confirmed as the second official single of Twista's seventh album, after the lead single Wetter featuring singer Erika Shevon

The remix version of the song features Akon and two verses from Bulgarian R&B singer LiLana.

Samples
The song uses samples from the single “Sound of Arena” by Finnish DJ/Producer Kimmo Kauppinen.

American hip hop songs
2009 singles
Songs written by Akon
2009 songs
EMI Records singles
Songs written by Twista